Pierre-Auguste Sarrus (March 14 or 15, 1813 – May 3, 1876) was a French musician and inventor.

History 
 He joined the army at the age of 23.
 November 27, 1843: Sarrus is affected to the  74th Régiment d'Infanterie as corporal-chief of the music, it is the start of his military musician career.
 August 18, 1846: wedding with Mélanie Bellemère.
 1852: Sarrus receives the Médaille militaire.
 1854: Member of the Expédition d'Orient (Crimean War), he receives the Médaille de Crimée.
 April 2, 1855: he is affected to the 13th Régiment d'Infanterie.
 July 10, 1855: he is promoted officer.
 1860-61: member of the Campaign of Syria.
 1863: he receives the 5th class Turkish Médjidié's order and the Victoria Cross.
 December 26, 1864: he is made knight of the Légion d'honneur.
 July 10, 1867: Sarrus gets retired, he was then chief of music (ranking as a lieutenant) of the 13th Régiment d'Infanterie de Ligne.

Nevertheless, Pierre-Auguste Sarrus is not famous for his military career, but for having invented a music instrument to replace the oboe and bassoon in military music in 1856.  Pierre-Louis Gautrot built this instrument and patented it under the name sarrusophone.

References

External links
 The Sarrusophone, article from the  Dr. George A. Conrey in The Double Reed, Vol. 10, No. 3

1813 births
1876 deaths
People from Aveyron
19th-century French inventors
19th-century French musicians
French soldiers
Chevaliers of the Légion d'honneur